The 2016 Four Nations Tournament was the 15th edition of the Four Nations Tournament, an invitational women's football tournament held in China.

Participants

Venues

Final standings

Match results

References 

2016 in women's association football
2016
2016 in Chinese football
2016 in South Korean football
2015–16 in Mexican football
2016 in Vietnamese football
January 2016 sports events in China
2016 in Chinese women's sport
2016 in Vietnamese women's sport